Jeftić is a surname. Notable people with the surname include:

Danina Jeftić (born 1986), Serbian actress and handball player
Dejan Jeftić (born 1989), Bosnian professional basketball player

See also
Jevtić

Serbian surnames